Edward MacDonald (Dr. Ed) is the Chair of the Faculty of Arts at the University of Prince Edward Island in Charlottetown. He is an Associate Professor of history, teaching about Canadian political history, Atlantic Canada and Prince Edward Island.

Writing
 If You're Stronghearted: Prince Edward Island in the 20th Century (2000).
 The Landscapes of Confederation (2010)
 Time and a Place, An Environmental History of Prince Edward Island

Honors
 Dr. MacDonald was honored with the Award of Honour by PEI Museum and Heritage Foundation in 2017.
 Lieutenant Governor's Award

References

Academic staff of the University of Prince Edward Island
Living people
20th-century Canadian historians
21st-century Canadian historians
20th-century Canadian male writers
21st-century Canadian male writers
Canadian male non-fiction writers
Writers from Charlottetown
Year of birth missing (living people)